Nevena Jovanović (born Junе 30, 1990) is a Serbian professional women's basketball player who plays for Basket Landes of the Ligue Féminine. She also represents the Serbian national basketball team.

While playing with Partizan, she won Serbian League championship in 2013, national cup in 2013 and Adriatic League Women championship in 2013.

International career
She represented Serbian national basketball team at the EuroBasket 2015 in Budapest where they won the gold medal, and qualified for the 2016 Olympics, first in the history for the Serbian team.

References

External links
Profile at eurobasket.com
Profile at eurobasketwomen2013.com
Profile at fiba.com

1990 births
Living people
Sportspeople from Kraljevo
Shooting guards
Serbian women's basketball players
ŽKK Radivoj Korać players
ŽKK Partizan players
Basketball players at the 2016 Summer Olympics
Olympic basketball players of Serbia
Olympic bronze medalists for Serbia
Medalists at the 2016 Summer Olympics
Olympic medalists in basketball
European champions for Serbia
Serbian expatriate basketball people in France
Serbian expatriate basketball people in Hungary
Serbian expatriate basketball people in Turkey
Mediterranean Games silver medalists for Serbia
Competitors at the 2009 Mediterranean Games
Mediterranean Games medalists in basketball
Basketball players at the 2020 Summer Olympics